John Bigelow Slade-Baker (1896-1966) was an English soldier, journalist and spy.

Life
John Slade-Baker was born on 29 July 1896, the son of Brig. Gen. Arthur Slade-Baker, CMG, and Caroline Fisher Heape, of Robertsbridge. He was educated at Marlborough College before going on to the Royal Military College, Sandhurst. He rose to the rank of Colonel in the army, retiring in 1947.

From 1952 to 1960 he was Middle East correspondent for The Sunday Times. According to James Barr, Slade-Baker was an MI6 agent. In 1955, with Britain and Saudi Arabia at loggerheads over the Buraimi Dispute, he persuaded St. John Philby to depict the corruption of the Saudi royal family for The Sunday Times.

The Israeli politician Moshe Sharett was unimpressed upon meeting Slade-Baker in 1955:

Slade-Baker died in London on 19 April 1966. His diaries and papers relating to the Middle East are held at the Middle East Centre Archive, St Antony's College, Oxford.

References

1896 births
1966 deaths
Indian Defence Force officers
English journalists
Secret Intelligence Service personnel
People educated at Marlborough College
The Sunday Times people